Kavalan Distillery is a Taiwanese whisky distillery. It is owned by the King Car Group and is located at Yuanshan Township, Yilan County, Taiwan.

History

The distillery is named after the old name of Yilan County. The distillery was completed in December 2005, produced its first spirit in March 2006, and released its first bottling in December 2008.

After its first few runs Kavalan bought a new set of much larger German stills to expand production. After experimenting with these stills from 2008-2010 they decided to retire them as they produced an alcohol which was too processed and didn’t allow them to work with texture and flavor.

In January 2010, one of the distillery's products caused a stir by beating three Scotch whiskies and one English whisky in a blind tasting organised in Leith, Scotland, to celebrate Burns Night.

The distillery was named by Whisky Magazine as the World Icons of Whisky "Whisky Visitor Attraction of the Year" for 2011, and its products have won several other awards.

In 2012, Kavalan's Solist Fino Sherry Cask malt whisky was named "new whisky of the year" by Jim Murray in his guide, Jim Murray’s Whisky Bible.

In 2015, Kavalan's Vinho Barrique expression was named the world's best single malt whisky by World Whiskies Awards.

In 2016, Kavalan's Solist Amontillado Sherry Single Cask Strength was named the World's Best Single Cask Single Malt Whisky by World Whiskies Award.

Ian Chang left Kavalan in early 2020.

Whisky variants

Kavalan single malt whisky is currently sold in 19 variants.

Kavalan Series
Kavalan Class Single Malt Whisky

Kavalan Concertmaster Single Malt Whisky

King Car Conductor Single Malt Whisky

Kavalan Podium Single Malt Whisky

Kavalan ex-Bourbon Oak Single Malt Whisky

Kavalan Sherry Oak Single Malt Whisky

Kavalan Distillery Reserve Single Cask Strength Single Malt Whisky (Peaty Cask)

Solist Series
Kavalan Solist ex-Bourbon Single Cask Strength Single Malt Whisky

Kavalan Solist Sherry Single Cask Strength Single Malt Whisky

Kavalan Solist Fino Single Cask Strength Single Malt Whisky

Kavalan Solist Vinho Barrique Single Cask Strength Single Malt Whisky

Kavalan Solist Brandy Single Cask Strength Single Malt Whisky

Kavalan Solist Amontillado Sherry Single Cask Strength Single Malt Whisky

Kavalan Solist Manzanilla Sherry Single Cask Strength Single Malt Whisky

Kavalan Solist PX Sherry Single Cask Strength Single Malt Whisky

Kavalan Solist Moscatel Sherry Single Cask Single Malt Whisky

Kavalan Solist Port Single Cask Strength Single Malt Whisky

Kavalan Solist Peaty Cask Single Malt Whisky

Premium Series
Kavalan Premium Single Cask Strength Single Malt Whisky (Amontillado & Manzanilla Sherry Cask)

Kavalan Premium Single Cask Strength Single Malt Whisky (PX Sherry Cask)

Gin
In 2019 Kavalan introduced a gin. Kavalan’s gin sets itself apart from other gin offering by using Taiwanese herbs, spices, and botanicals like kumquat, red guava, and dried star fruit. The gin is produced using the set of German stills Kavalan bought in its early days.

Recognition 
The distillery has been recognized as one of the highest rated spirits during the World Whiskies Awards, and in 2021 was named the Best World Whiskey at the International Wines & Spirits Competition.

References

Notes

Bibliography

External links

Kavalan Whisky  – official site

This article is based upon a translation of the French language version as of May 2014.

Distilleries in Taiwan
Food and drink companies established in 2005
Taiwanese brands
Taiwanese whisky
Alcohol in Taiwan
Taiwanese companies established in 2005
King Car Group